Andrew MacLaren Considine (born 1 April 1987) is a Scottish professional footballer who plays as a defender for Scottish Premiership club St Johnstone. He played over 550 times for Aberdeen across 18 years, ranking among the players with most appearances in their history, and three times for the Scotland national team. Considine left Aberdeen after the 2021–22 season and signed for St Johnstone.

Club career

Aberdeen
Considine had the option of signing for Rangers as a youngster, but decided to sign for Aberdeen as he felt he had more chance of breaking into their first team. He made his professional debut in May 2004 in a 2–1 defeat to Dundee, making his second appearance at the end of the following season. In 2005–06, Considine reached double figures in terms of appearances and became a first team regular in the 2006–07 season, playing in 36 matches and scoring his first goals for Aberdeen in a 2–0 victory at St Mirren in January 2007.

Considine started every league match for Aberdeen in the 2011–12 season and was the club's player of the year. He continued to play regularly in the 2012–13 season, but suffered a broken leg in a match against Dundee on 29 December.

On 29 December 2014, Considine signed a two-and-a-half-year extension to his contract, keeping him at Aberdeen until the summer of 2017. Considine was rewarded for his long service to Aberdeen with a testimonial match, played against Dutch club Twente on 27 March 2015.

Considine signed another contract extension on 14 February 2017, keeping him at Aberdeen until 2019. On 31 March 2017, he scored a hat-trick in a 7–0 win over Dundee at Dens Park.

On 13 May 2018, he scored the only goal in a 1–0 win for Aberdeen against Celtic at Parkhead, which secured a 2nd place finish for Aberdeen in the 2017–18 Scottish Premiership.

In April 2019, he signed a two-year contract extension with the option of a further year. He made his 500th appearance for Aberdeen on 24 November 2019, in a league match at St Johnstone. His contract was extended to the end of the 2021–22 season in December 2020. 

Considine missed most of the 2021–22 season after suffering a cruciate ligament injury. He returned to fitness during the spring of 2022, but it was announced in April 2022 that he would leave the club at the end of the season as a new contract could not be agreed.

St Johnstone
Considine signed for St Johnstone on 16 June 2022.

International career
Considine played twice for the Scotland under-20 side, featuring at the 2007 Under-20 World Cup, and four times for Scotland under-21s.

Despite being a long-serving player at a high domestic club level with Aberdeen, Considine was not selected for the full Scotland national team for most of his career. He finally earned selection in October 2020, aged 33, after six players dropped out of the initial squad due to injuries and COVID-19. He made his debut in a 1–0 victory against Slovakia, becoming the oldest Scotland debutant since 36-year-old goalkeeper Ronnie Simpson 53 years earlier.

Personal life
Considine was born and raised in Banchory. He is the son of former Aberdeen defender Doug Considine.

Considine received attention in the media and online in 2015 when a humorous video of him dancing in drag with friends on his stag party, intended only for view by guests at his wedding, was released publicly. Five years later, the incident resurfaced when the song from the video ("Yes Sir, I Can Boogie" by Baccara) was chanted by the Scotland players, including Considine, in celebrations after qualifying for the UEFA Euro 2020 tournament and was adopted as one of the national team 'anthems' by supporters.

Career statistics

Club

International

Honours
Aberdeen
Scottish League Cup: 2013–14; runner-up: 2016–17, 2018–19
Scottish Cup runner-up: 2016–17

References

External links
Profile at the Aberdeen F.C. website

1987 births
Living people
People from Banchory
Footballers from Aberdeenshire
Scottish footballers
Scotland youth international footballers
Scotland under-21 international footballers
Scotland international footballers
Association football defenders
Aberdeen F.C. players
Scottish Premier League players
Scottish Professional Football League players
St Johnstone F.C. players